Rhodophaea formosa is a moth of the family Pyralidae. It is found in most of Europe.

The moth flies in one generation from July to August.

The larvae feed on elm.

Notes
The flight season refers to Belgium and the Netherlands. This may vary in other parts of the range.

References

External links

waarneming.nl .
Lepidoptera of Belgium

Phycitinae
Moths described in 1811
Moths of Europe